Nadira Babbar (born 20 January 1948) is an Indian theatre actress, director and an actress in Hindi cinema, who is the recipient of Sangeet Natak Akademi Award in 2001. Nadira founded a Mumbai-based theatre group called Ekjute, a known name in Hindi theatre in 1981.

Nadira Babbar  was seen playing mother to Aishwarya Rai in Gurinder Chadha's film Bride and Prejudice (2004), and M. F. Hussain's Meenaxi: A Tale of Three Cities (2004). She was also portrayed as the mother of Salman Khan in Sohail Khan's Jai Ho and as the mother of  Raj Bansal (main villain) in Sunny Deol's 2016 movie named Ghayal Once Again.

Early life

She graduated from National School of Drama (NSD), New Delhi in 1971. Nadira was a Gold Medallist at NSD and went to Germany on a scholarship, and later got a chance to work with renowned directors like Grotovisky and Peter Brooks.

Career

She started her theatre group in  Ekjute (Together) in 1981 in Delhi, which came out with its first production Yahudi Ki Ladki in 1981, which revived the Parsi theatre style, and is considered one of its finest. The group has also been performing the Bhavai-based musical, Jasma Odhan, written by Shanta Gandhi for several years now. Nadira moved to Mumbai in 1988, and reestablished her theatre group.

Over the last 30 years, Ekjute has given Indian theatre over sixty plays including Sandhya Chhaya, Look Back in Anger, Ballabpur Ki Roop Katha, Baat Laat Ki Halaat Ki, Bharam Ke Bhoot, Shabash Anarkali and Begum Jaan; apart from directing plays written by herself: Dayashankar Ki Diary (1997), Sakku Bai (1999), Suman Aur Sana and Ji Jaisi Aapki Marzi. It has worked with actors like Raj Babbar, Satish Kaushik and Kirron Kher.

In 1990, Ekjute started the 'Ekjute Young People's Theatre Group', which has given productions like Aao Picnic Challen and Azdak Ka Insaaf. The groups celebrated 30 years of its foundation in 2011, with a week-long theatre festival, 30 Years Caravan 2011, at Prithvi Theatres, Mumbai which began on 14 April 2011. She also appeared in Salman Khan-starrer Hindi movie Jai Ho (2014).

In 2016, she featured in Sunny Deol's Ghayal Once Again.

Nadira Babbar was recently seen in the web series, The Married Woman, directed by Sahir Raza. The star cast also includes Ridhi Dogra and Monica Dogra.

Awards 
 Newsmakers Achievers Awards 2022

See also
 Theatre in India

References

External links

 Official website of 'Ekjute'
 Sandhya Chhaya in Pakistan

Indian film actresses
Indian stage actresses
Indian theatre directors
Indian women dramatists and playwrights
Recipients of the Sangeet Natak Akademi Award
National School of Drama alumni
Living people
Hindi theatre
1948 births
Actresses from Mumbai
Screenwriters from Mumbai
20th-century Indian dramatists and playwrights
20th-century Indian women writers
21st-century Indian dramatists and playwrights
21st-century Indian women writers
21st-century Indian writers
Women writers from Maharashtra
Indian women theatre directors
Dramatists and playwrights from Maharashtra